Edward "Red" Nower (1921–2006) was a Grey Cup champion Canadian Football League player. He played fullback.

A native Montrealer, Nower first won the Grey Cup with the champion St. Hyacinthe-Donnacona Navy team. After a season with the Montreal Hornets, he joined the Montreal Alouettes in 1948 and was part of the Larks first Grey Cup championship. He worked with an electrical utility while playing with the Als.

References

1921 births
2006 deaths
High School of Montreal alumni
Montreal Alouettes players
Players of Canadian football from Quebec
Anglophone Quebec people
Canadian football people from Montreal